Edgar W. Schneider's dynamic model of postcolonial Englishes adopts an evolutionary perspective emphasizing language ecologies. It shows how language evolves as a process of 'competition-and-selection', and how certain linguistic features emerge. The Dynamic Model illustrates how the histories and ecologies will determine language structures in the different varieties of English, and how linguistic and social identities are maintained.

Underlying principles 
Five underlying principles underscore the Dynamic Model: 
 The closer the contact, or higher the degree of bilingualism or multilingualism in a community, the stronger the effects of contact.
 The structural effects of language contact depends on social conditions. Therefore, history will play an important part.
 Contact-induced changes can be achieved by a variety of mechanisms, from code-switching to code alternation to acquisition strategies.
 Language evolution, and the emergence of contact-induced varieties, can be regarded as speakers making selections from a pool of linguistic variants made available to them.
 Which features will be ultimately adopted depends on the complete “ecology” of the contact situation, including factors such as demography, social relationships, and surface similarities between languages etc.

The Dynamic Model outlines five major stages of the evolution of world Englishes. These stages will take into account the perspectives from the two major parties of agents – settlers (STL) and indigenous residents (IDG). Each phase is defined by four parameters: 
 Extralinguistic factors (e.g. historical events)
 Characteristic identity constructions for both parties
 Sociolinguistic determinants of contact setting
 Structural effects that emerge

See also
Bilingualism
Identity (social science)
Indigenous languages
Language change
Language contact
World Englishes

References 

Anglic languages
Language contact
Sociolinguistics
Theories of language